Vassilis Angelopoulos (born February 13, 1965) is a Greek American physicist. He is a specialist on Space and Astrophysical Plasmas.

Since July, 2007, he has been on the faculty of the Department of Earth, Planetary, and Space Sciences and the Institute of Geophysics and Planetary Physics at the University of California, Los Angeles (UCLA). Vassilis is currently the Principal Investigator of the ELFIN Cubesat mission and Co-Investigator of ELFIN-L, leading the energetic particle detector (EPD) experiment  at UCLA.

He is the Principal Investigator of THEMIS, a five satellite and 20 ground-based observatory mission proposed and managed by the University of California, Berkeley's Space Sciences Laboratory, launched in February 2007. He is also the Principal Investigator of the ARTEMIS mission, a two satellite mission around the moon: a collaboration between UCB, JPL and UCLA, proposed in 2008, executed in 2009 and operating since 2010.

Education
1986: B.S. in Physics, Aristotle University of Thessaloniki, Greece
1988: M.S. in Physics, UCLA
1993: Ph.D. in Physics with specialization in Space Plasma Physics, UCLA

Honors and awards
American Geophysical Union Fred Scarf Award (1993)
COSPAR Zeldovich Medal (2000)
American Geophysical Union Macelwane Medal (2001)
American Geophysical Union Fellow

References

External links
 His web page on UCLA’s site
 His web page on Berkeley’s site
 His biography on the Nasa’s site
 Current work with the Experimental Space Physics Group at UCLA

Greek emigrants to the United States
Aristotle University of Thessaloniki alumni
University of California, Los Angeles alumni
UCLA Department of Earth Planetary and Space Sciences alumni
University of California, Berkeley College of Letters and Science faculty
University of California, Los Angeles faculty
Fellows of the American Geophysical Union
21st-century American physicists
21st-century Greek physicists
Year of birth missing (living people)
Living people